Jean-Louis Robert Frédéric Dumas (2 February 1938 – 1 May 2010) was a French billionaire businessman who was the chairman of the Hermès group from 1978 to 2006. He was also the company's artistic director. Dumas is credited with turning Hermès into a global luxury brand during his tenure as chairman.

Early life and education
Jean-Louis Robert Frédéric Dumas was born in Paris, France, on 2 February 1938. He also used the last name Dumas-Hermès. His father was Robert Dumas, and his mother was one of Émile-Maurice Hermès' four daughters. Dumas' grandfather Émile-Maurice Hermès had been a grandson of the company founder Thierry Hermès. Dumas attended the Institut d’Études Politiques de Paris, also dubbed Sciences Po. He also traveled in Iran, Afghanistan, and Nepal in a Citroën 2CV. After travelling in Scandinavia and Czechoslovakia while the drummer of a jazz ensemble, Dumas was sent to Algeria to perform his compulsory military service.

Career
In 1963, Dumas entered Bloomingdale's buyer-trainer program in New York. In 1964, he joined Hermès, which his family had founded in 1837. Dumas later became CEO of the Hermès Group and served as the company's artistic director. His father died in 1978, and Dumas became chairman. Expanding into the United States and Asia, he turned Hermès into a global brand after taking in the chairmanship, adding interests in fashion designer Jean-Paul Gaultier and the Leica camera maker to the company.

In the 1980s Gaultier was working on fashion design in Paris, with Belgian designer Martin Margiela working as his design assistant from 1984 to 1987. He took the company public in 1993, with around 3/4 of the company remaining family-owned. Jean Louis-Dumas retired as the chairman and artistic director of Hermès in January 2006 due to declining health.  He was replaced in the position by his son Pierre-Alexis Dumas.

Family and death
His wife Rena Dumas (née Gregoriadès) (1937–2009) was a Greek-born architect who founded Rena Dumas Architecture Intérieure in 1972 in Paris. They married in 1962. Pierre-Alexis Dumas is their son, while their daughter Sandrine is a film actress.

Jean-Louis Dumas died in Paris on 1 May 2010, at the age of 72. He took photographs throughout his life, and in 2008, Steidl published Jean-Louis Dumas: Photographer, a collection of his photographs.

References

Further reading

 

1938 births
2010 deaths
French Protestants
Businesspeople from Paris
Hermès-Dumas family
French billionaires